Paraguay is a settlement and consejo popular ("popular council") in Cuba near Guantánamo Bay. It is located in the northern part of the municipality of Caimanera, near Mariana Grajales Airport.

See also
Las Lajas
Arroyo Hondo
List of cities in Cuba

References

Populated places in Guantánamo Province
Guantánamo